The Rural Municipality of Moose Mountain No. 63 is a rural municipality (RM) in the Canadian province of Saskatchewan within Census Division No. 1 and  Division No. 1. It is located in the south-east portion of the province.

History

The RM of Moose Mountain No. 63 incorporated as a rural municipality on December 11, 1911. It derived its name from the large number of moose that inhabit the Moose Mountain Uplands in the north-west corner of the RM.

The Church of All Saints, built in 1885, and the Humphrys/Hewlett House, built in 1888, are historical properties located in Cannington Manor Provincial Park. The park is in the north-east corner of the RM and is a IUCN protected area category III and on the Canadian Register of Historic Places.

Communities and localities
The following urban municipalities are surrounded by the RM.

Towns
 Carlyle

Villages
 Manor

The following unincorporated communities are within the RM.

Organized hamlets
Cannington Lake

Localities
 Carlyle Lake Resort (White Bear)
 Cowper, an unincorporated Canadian National Railway (CNR) point located at 49° 40'N, 102° 7'W; NE 19-8-1 W2, just east of Cowper Creek
Elevation: 653 metres
A post office opened there on 1 August, 1911 and closed four years later on 31 December, 1915
Cowper was named after the British poet, William Cowper
 Fremantle, an unincorporated Canadian Pacific Railway (CPR) platform located at 49° 8'N, 102° 23'W; SE 17-8-3 W2
Elevation 627 metres
Consisted of a siding, railway platform, and 2 grain elevators that no longer exist
 Glen Adelaide, unincorporated locality at 49° 47' 0"N, 102° 2' 2"W; NW 10-10-1 W2
The Glen Adelaide Cemetery was established in 1897
 Service, an unincorporated CN Railway point located at 49° 40'N, 102° 2'W; SE 28-8-1 W2
Elevation 652 metres
Named after Robert W. Service
 Steppes, an unincorporated CP Railway point located at 49° 37'N, 102° 11'W; NE 3-8-2 W2
Elevation 628 metres
Consisted of a siding, railway platform, and a grain elevator that no longer exist
 Wordsworth

Cowper, Service, and Wordsworth are all named after famous British and Canadian poets. They are all found along the CN Railway and are part of "Poet's Corner", along with several other communities along that railway line in south-east Saskatchewan.

Parks and recreation

There are two provincial parks within the RM of Moose Mountain. Near the north-east corner is Cannington Manor Provincial Park and along the north part of the RM in the Moose Mountain Upland is Moose Mountain Provincial Park.

Near the north-west corner of the RM on the eastern shore of Kippan Lake, along the border of Moose Mountain Provincial Park, is Saskairie (49°42'24.0"N 102°23'06.1"W). Saskairie is a Nature Conservancy of Canada property that was established in 1974 by Prairie Lore and Living Society on three-quarters of a section of woodland wilderness. Prairie Lore and Living Society was formed in 1972 as a non-profit organisation. The three founding members were Jack MacKenzie, Don Stewart, and Nora Stewart.

The park was originally created to provide a year-round outdoor and environmental educational facility for students. In 1977, a cabin was built that could accommodate 32 people.

Saskairie gallery

Demographics 

Government
The RM of Moose Mountain No. 63 is governed by an elected municipal council and an appointed administrator that meets on the second Thursday of every month. The reeve of the RM is Kelly Brimner while its administrator is Kim Cassibo. The RM's office is located in Carlyle.

Gallery

See also
List of protected areas of Saskatchewan
Tourism in Saskatchewan

References

M

Division No. 1, Saskatchewan